William Creel may refer to:
 William C. Creel, American politician and civil servant in North Carolina
 William Jackson Creel, member of the Florida House of Representatives